Teika is a neighbourhood in the Vidzeme Suburb of Riga, the capital of Latvia.

Teika is the only neighbourhood in Riga which was planned and partly built in the 1920s and 1930s during interwar Latvia. Built up areas consists mainly from 1- to 2-storey family houses, but there are also 5-storey apartment houses, especially around Brīvības street and Zemitāns Square. Teika was planned as a very modern district for those times and today is known for its Functionalist architecture which was widely practiced there.

Gallery

References

Neighbourhoods in Riga